Corridon is an unincorporated community in western Reynolds County, Missouri, United States. It is located approximately one mile south of Reynolds and seven miles southwest of Centerville.

A post office called Corridon was established in 1901, and remained in operation until 1972. The name Corridon was selected by postal officials.

References

Unincorporated communities in Reynolds County, Missouri
Unincorporated communities in Missouri